"NT Card" is a brand name for a memory card which is used by C-Map / Jeppesen company for their line of electronic nautical charts.  It's unknown what the generic name for these cartridges is.

It is a unique package -- measuring 24 x 44 x 2.5mm -- which may be inserted lengthwise or by one end, as two interchangeable sets of brass contacts are present.

Various capacities are available. The other proprietary names for these cards are NT+, and NT-Max which refer to the type of charting that may be programmed on to the memory cartridges themselves.

Solid-state computer storage media